Cirencester Amphitheatre was a Roman amphitheatre in Cirencester, Gloucestershire, England. Its remains are scheduled as an ancient monument.

Archaeological digs have uncovered the earthworks, revealing the outline of the construction, which is still visible, with the banking reaching 25 feet from the bottom of the arena. Roman artefacts including coins and pottery have been discovered on the site. It is estimated that it was constructed towards the beginning of the 2nd century.

In Roman Britain, Cirencester was known as Corinium Dobunnorum, and was the second biggest town in Britannia, after Londinium (London). This amphitheatre is also the second largest, which indicates the significance of the location in Roman times. Although only slightly larger in diameter than the amphitheatre in Silchester, it has much higher sides.
The earthworks show evidence of tiered wooden seats for around 8000 people, placed upon terraces made of stone, although a timber-only structure may have existed before the 2nd century. There are two entrances, at the north-east and south-west ends of the stadium.

During the 5th century, when the Western Roman Empire was under attack and soldiers returned to Rome to defend it, the amphitheatre was fortified to defend against the invading Saxons. Wooden structures were erected within the arena, placed in postholes, and the north-east entrance was partly blocked.

Unlike other amphitheatres, it is aligned in parallel to the streets of the town.

It has also been referred to as the 'Bull Ring', because the sport of bull-baiting used to take place there.

In 2012, plans were announced by the Cirencester Town Council to improve access and signage at the site. Further plans for a visitor centre and car park followed in 2014.

See also
 List of Roman amphitheatres

References

External links 

English Heritage details of the amphitheatre

Amphitheatre
Amphitheatres in Roman Britain
Ruins in Gloucestershire
Scheduled monuments in Gloucestershire